Utah's 3rd congressional district is a congressional district in the United States House of Representatives. It is located in southern and eastern Utah and includes the cities of Orem and Provo.

The district was created when Utah was awarded an extra congressional seat following redistricting cycle after the 1980 Census. Four of its five Representatives have been Republicans; Bill Orton, a Democrat, represented the district from 1991 to 1997. The current Representative is Republican John Curtis, elected in a special election on November 7, 2017.

Recent election results from statewide races 
Results Under Current Lines (Since 2023)

Results Under Old Lines (2013-2023)

Results Under Old Lines (2003-2013)

List of members representing the district

Election results

1982

1984

1986

1988

1990

1992

1994

1996

1998

2000

2002

2004

2006

2008

2010

2012

2014

2016

2017 (Special)

2018

2020

2022

Historical district boundaries

See also

Utah's congressional districts
List of United States congressional districts
Utah's 3rd congressional district special election, 2017

References
 Congressional Biographical Directory of the United States 1774–present

External links

03